Andorra is the fourth studio album by Canadian musician Dan Snaith, released under the stage name Caribou. It is Snaith's fourth album and his second as Caribou, following The Milk of Human Kindness. It was released in Germany on August 17, 2007 and in the United Kingdom on August 20 by City Slang, and in the United States on August 21 by Merge.

Andorra received critical acclaim and won the 2008 Polaris Music Prize.

Track listing

Charts

References

External links
 Andorra at official Caribou website
 

2007 albums
Dan Snaith albums
City Slang albums
Merge Records albums
Polaris Music Prize-winning albums